The Southern Power Distribution Company of Telangana, abbreviated as, TSSPDCL is a state Electricity Distribution company owned by the government of Telangana for the 15 southern districts of Telangana.

History

The Southern Power Distribution Company of Telangana Ltd (TSSPDCL) was incorporated under the Companies Act, 1956 as a public limited company on 02.06-2014 with headquarters at Hyderabad to carryout electricity distribution business as part of the unbundling of erstwhile A.P.S.E.B.

Infrastructure
TSSPDCL has a vast infrastructure facility in its operating area with 1,605 Nos. of 33/11 KV substations 3,102 Nos. of power transformers, 1,220 Nos. of 33 KV feeders 7,263 Nos. of 11 KV feeders and around 4,22,003 Nos. of distribution transformers of various capacities. In addition to these, solar power is also considered a priority in order to overcome the shortage of power in the state.

TSSPDCL Network

TSSPDCL encompasses an area of 15 districts viz., Mahabubnagar , Narayanpet, Nalgonda , Yadadri Bhuvanagiri , Suryapet , Siddipet , Medchal , Wanaparthy , Nagarkarnool , Jogulamba Gadwal , SangaReddy , Medak , Hyderabad , Vikarabad and Rangareddy Catering to the power requirements of 9.75 million consumers.

See also
Telangana State Northern Power Distribution Company Limited
Telangana Power Generation Corporation
Transmission Corporation of Telangana

References

Electric power distribution network operators in India
Energy in Telangana
State agencies of Telangana
State electricity agencies of India
Energy companies established in 2014
Indian companies established in 2014
2014 establishments in Telangana